Graham Hurst may refer to:

 Graham Hurst (cricketer)  (born 1960), former English cricketer
 Graham Hurst (footballer) (born 1967), English former footballer